Bandar Al-Muktafi Billah Shah is a new town in Dungun, Terengganu, Malaysia. It was erected in honour of the 16th Sultan of Terengganu, Almarhum Sultan Mahmud Al-Muktafi Billah Shah.

Facilities
Masjid Sultan Mahmud Al-Muktafi Billah Shah
Lembaga Kemajuan Terengganu Tengah (Central Terengganu Development Authority) (Ketengah) main headquarters
Bandar Al-Muktafi Billah Shah Restaurant and Rest Plaza (R//R) at Jerangau Highway (Federal Route 14).

Educations
Sekolah Kebangsaan Durian Mas 1 Bandar Al-Muktafi Billah Shah
Sekolah Kebangsaan Durian Mas 2 Bandar Al-Muktafi Billah Shah
Sekolah Menengah Kebangsaan Durian Mas Bandar Al-Muktafi Billah Shah

References

Dungun District
Towns in Terengganu